Cruise Yourself is the third studio album by American post-hardcore band Girls Against Boys, released in October 1994 by record label Touch and Go.

Reception 

Cruise Yourself has received a mixed-to-favorable response from critics.

Accolades

Track listing

Personnel 
Adapted from the Cruise Yourself liner notes.

 Girls Against Boys
 Alexis Fleisig – drums
 Eli Janney – organ, vibraphone, bass guitar, engineering
 Scott McCloud – lead vocals, guitar
 Johnny Temple – bass guitar, sampler

Production and additional personnel
 Ted Niceley – production
 Mike Rippe – additional engineering

Release history

References

External links 
 

1994 albums
Girls Against Boys albums
Touch and Go Records albums
Albums produced by Ted Niceley